Benedictia maxima is a species of freshwater snail with an operculum, an aquatic gastropod mollusc in the family Lithoglyphidae.

Subspecies 
 Benedictia maxima maxima (W. Dybowski, 1875)
 Benedictia maxima marisminus (Sitnikova, 1987)

Distribution 
Benedictia maxima maxima lives in the southern and central parts of Lake Baikal, Siberia, in depths from 40 to 260 m. The type locality for Benedictia maxima maxima is Kultuk, in southern Baikal.

Benedictia maxima marisminus lives in the northern part of Lake Baikal, in depths from 20 to 220 m. The type locality for Benedictia maxima marisminus is Maloe More, in northern Baikal.

References

External links 

Lithoglyphidae
Gastropods described in 1875